The Prix Stanislas Julien is a prize for a sinological work (usually) published in the previous year. It is named after the French sinologist, Stanislas Julien, and is awarded by the Académie des Inscriptions et Belles-Lettres. The prize was established in 1872 and first awarded in 1875.

Prize winners

See also
 Prix Giles, awarded biennially for a work related to China, Japan or East Asia that was published in the previous two years by a French author

References 

Sinology
Academic awards
French awards
Awards established in 1872